INV may refer to:

 Inverter (logic gate)
 Inverness Airport, IATA airport code
 Inverness railway station, Scotland; National Rail station code INV
 Inverness-shire, county in Scotland, Chapman code
 Irish National Volunteers
 Inverse (mathematics)
 Invected (Drosophila melanogaster gene)